Acta Archaeologica Sinica, also known by its Chinese title Kaogu Xuebao, is a quarterly academic journal published by the Institute of Archaeology, Chinese Academy of Social Sciences. 

First published in 1936 as Field Archaeology Report (田野考古报告), the journal focuses on the publication of excavation reports and related archaeological research papers. Its Chinese title was changed to Zhongguo Kaogu Xuebao in 1947, and changed again to the current name in 1953.

According to SCImago Journal Rank (SJR), the journal h-index is 13, ranking it to Q2 in Archeology (arts and humanities) and in Archeology.

References

Archaeology journals
Archaeology of China
Chinese-language journals
Publications established in 1936
1936 establishments in China
Quarterly journals
Chinese Academy of Social Sciences